Neoascia pavlovskii is a species of hoverfly in the family Syrphidae.

Distribution
Tajikistan.

References

Eristalinae
Insects described in 1955
Diptera of Asia
Taxa named by Aleksandr Stackelberg